Laura Una Greene (born 16 February 1972) is a British former weather presenter and television presenter.

Early life and career 
Laura Greene was born at University College Hospital in Fitzrovia, London, the daughter of Welsh DIY expert Harry Greene and English actress Marjie Lawrence. She is sister of presenter Sarah and Robin Greene, and made occasional appearances on Blue Peter with Sarah. Laura attended Stepping Stones nursery school in Hampstead, London, and then Bedales junior schools Dunnanie and Dunhurst before Bedales School, near Petersfield, Hampshire.

Career
After graduating from the University of London with a bachelor's degree in Geography, Greene began her career in 1994 at Britain's ITV network.

In 2002 she became the co-presenter of National Geographic Today, a live one-hour daily news journal on the UK's National Geographic Channel.

Greene has also worked for Carlton TV's London Tonight and Channel 5's 5 News before becoming a reporter and presenter for Meridian Broadcasting's Meridian Tonight.

Greene is a Fellow of the Royal Geographical Society.

She moved to the United States after being offered a job with the National Geographic Channel.

Personal life
Greene met her husband, Peter, after she moved to Washington, D.C., U.S. They have one daughter.

References

External links

1972 births
Living people
Alumni of the University of London
People from St Pancras, London
English meteorologists
People from Petersfield
English people of Welsh descent
English television presenters
Fellows of the Royal Geographical Society